Elvira of Castile may refer to:

 Elvira of Castile, Queen of León (965–1017)
 Elvira of Toro (1038/9 – 1101)
 Elvira of Castile, Countess of Toulouse (before 1082?-1151)
 Elvira of Castile, Queen of Sicily (c. 1100 – 1135)

See also
Elvira of León (disambiguation)